Frog Mobile is a pre-paid mobile service, offered in Greece by Cosmote, one of the three major mobile network operators of Greece.
Sometimes, it is wrongly labelled mobile virtual network operator, but is in effect a no-thrills, low-cost pre-paid service aimed at budget users and people with limited economic opportunities or people interested in basic mobile communication only.

External links
Official website

Mobile phone companies of Greece